The 2015 East Tennessee State Buccaneers football team represented East Tennessee State University in the 2015 NCAA Division I FCS football season. They were led by first-year head coach Carl Torbush. The 2015 season was their first season since 2003, when the program was discontinued. They played their home games at Kermit Tipton Stadium, located on the campus of Science Hill High School. For the 2015 season, the Buccaneers were classified as an FCS independent school, meaning they had no athletic conference affiliation in football for the season. However, they will become football members of the Southern Conference in 2016, a league that ETSU rejoined for non-football sports in 2014 after a nine-year absence. They finished the season 2–9 with wins over Warner and Kentucky Wesleyan.

Roster and staff

NOTE:  Most redshirt players practiced with the team during 2014 during the program's first signed class.  That first signed class is redshirted while they practice entirely during the 2014 season.

Schedule

Game summaries

Kennesaw State

Maryville College

at Charleston Southern

Emory & Henry

Saint Francis

at Mercer

at Montana State

Warner

at Robert Morris

at Gardner-Webb

Kentucky Wesleyan

References

East Tennessee State
East Tennessee State Buccaneers football seasons
East Tennessee State Buccaneers football